Dale Hample is an American argumentation and rhetorical scholar, associate professor  at the University of Maryland . He has published many peer-reviewed journal articles, book chapters, and written one book and edited another.

After receiving a PhD at the University of Illinois in 1975, he taught at Western Illinois University until 2007, when he took a teaching position at Maryland.  Some of his major accomplishments include developing measures for the ways in which people edit arguments (cognitive editorial standards), discussing how people produce argumentative discourse (inventional capacity), and how they view arguments (argument frames and taking conflict personally).

He is currently the editor of Argumentation and Advocacy, and editor of the Issues Forum of Communication Monographs, and is on the editorial boards for ten other journals in his subject.

Publications

Books
Hample, D Arguing: Exchanging Reasons Face to Face  Lawrence Erlbaum Associates; 2005.  .
Benoit, W.L., Hample, D., & Benoit, P. (Eds.) (1992). Readings in Argumentation. Berlin: Foris.

Journal articles
Hample, D., Warner, B., & Norton, H. (2006). The effects of arguing expectations and predispositions on perceptions of argument quality and playfulness. Argumentation and Advocacy, 43(1), 1-13.
Hample, D., Thompson-Hayes, M., Wallenfelsz, K., Wallenfelsz, P., & Knapp, C. (2005). "Face-to-face arguing is an emotional experience: Triangulating methodologies and early findings."  Argumentation and Advocacy, 42, 74-93.
Cortes, C., Larson, C., & Hample, D. (2005). Relations among message design logic, interpersonal construct differentiation, and sex for Mexican and U.S. nationals. Journal of Intercultural Communication Research, 34, 108-118.
Hample, D. (2000). Cognitive editing of arguments and reasons for requests: Evidence from think-aloud protocols. Argumentation and Advocacy, 37, 98-108.
Hample, D. (1999). The life space of personalized conflicts. Communication Yearbook, 22, 171-208.
Hample, D., Benoit, P. J., Houston, J., Purifoy, G., VanHyfte, V., & Wardell, C. (1999). Naive theories of argument: Avoiding interpersonal arguments or cutting them short. Argumentation and Advocacy, 35, 130-139.
Hample, D., & Dallinger, J. M. (1998). On the etiology of the rebuff phenomenon: Why are persuasive messages less polite after rebuffs? Communication Studies, 49, 305-321.
Dallinger, J.M., & Hample, D. (1995). Personalizing and managing conflict. International Journal of Conflict Management, 6, 287-289.
Hample, D., & Dallinger, J.M. (1995). A Lewinian perspective on taking conflict personally: Revision, refinement, and validation of the instrument. Communication Quarterly, 43, 297-319.
Dallinger, J. M., & Hample, D. (1994). The effects of gender on compliance gaining strategy endorsement and suppression. Communication Reports, 7, 43-49.
Hample, D. (1992). Writing mindlessly. Communication Monographs, 59, 315-323.
Hample, D., & Dallinger, J.M. (1992). The use of multiple goals in cognitive editing of arguments. Argumentation and Advocacy, 28, 109-122.
Hample, D., & Dallinger, J.M. (1991). Message design logic, goal structure, interpersonal construct differentiation, and situation. In D. W. Parson (Ed.), Argument in Controversy (pp. 188–192). Annandale, VA: Speech Communication Association.
Hample, D. (1990). Debate as a civic act. Applying Research to the Classroom, 8, 1-2.
Hample, D., & Dallinger, J.M. (1990). Arguers as editors. Argumentation, 4, 153-169.
Dallinger, J.M., & Hample, D. (1988). Supervisor accessibility and job characteristics. Communication Research Reports, 5, 4-9.
Hample, D., & Dallinger, J.M. (1987). Self-monitoring and the cognitive editing of arguments. Central States Speech Journal, 38, 152-165.
Hample, D., & Dallinger, J.M. (1987). Cognitive editing of argument strategies. Human Communication Research, 14, 123-144.
Hample, D. (1987). The role of the unconscious in nonverbal information processing. Semiotica, 67, 211-231.
Hample, D. (1986). Argumentation and the unconscious. Journal of the American Forensic Association, 23, 82-95.
Hample, D. (1986). Logic, conscious and unconscious. Western Journal of Speech Communication, 50, 24-40.
Hample, D. (1985). Refinements on the cognitive model of argument. Western Journal of Speech Communication, 49, 267-285.
Hample, D. (1985). Teaching the cognitive context of argument. Communication Education, 34, 196-204.
Hample, D. (1985). A third perspective on argument. Philosophy and Rhetoric, 18, 1-22.
Hample, D. (1984). On the use of self-reports. Journal of the American Forensic Association, 20, 140-153.
Hample, D. (1982). Dual coding, reasoning and fallacies. Journal of the American Forensic Association, 19, 59-78.
Hample, D. (1981). Forensics research in the 1980s. Forensic, 66, 20-25.
Thompson, W.N., Hample, D., Hunt, S., & Pruett, R. (1981). What Is CEDA Debate? Forensic, 66, 4-9.
Hample, D. (1981). The cognitive context of argument. Western Journal of Speech Communication, 45, 148-158.
Hample, D. (1980). A cognitive view of argument. Journal of the American Forensic Association, 17, 151-158.
Hample, D. (1980). Purposes and effects of lying. Southern Speech Communication Journal, 46, 33-47.
Hample, D. (1980). Motives in law: An adaptation of legal realism. Journal of the American Forensic Association, 15, 156-168.
Blimling, G. S., & Hample, D. (1979). Structuring the peer environment in residence halls to increase academic performance in average-ability students. Journal of College Student Personnel, 20, 310-316.
Hample, D. (1979). Predicting belief and belief change using a cognitive theory of argument and evidence. Communication Monographs, 46, 142-146.
Hample, D. (1978). Are attitudes arguable? Journal of Value Inquiry, 12, 311-312.
Hample, D. (1978). Predicting immediate belief change and adherence to argument claims. Communication Monographs, 45, 219-228.
Hample, D., & Hample, J. (1978). Evidence credibility. Debate Issues, 12, 4-5.
Hample, D. (1977). Testing a model of value argument and evidence. Communication Monographs, 14, 106-120.
Hample, D. (1977). The Toulmin model and the syllogism. Journal of the American Forensic Association, 14, 1-9.
Wenzel, J.W., & Hample, D. (1975). Categories and dimensions of value propositions: Exploratory studies. Journal of the American Forensic Association, 11, 121-130.

Other publications
He has also published over two dozen chapters in specialized books and encyclopedias, and over 50 conference presentations.

References
"Argument as Cognition: A Putnamian Criticism of Dale Hample’s Cognitive Conception of Argument" in Argumentation Springer Netherlands, Volume 18, Number 3 331-348 / January, 2004 Abstract

External links
Curriculum Vitae

Year of birth missing (living people)
Living people
University of Illinois alumni
Western Illinois University faculty
University of Maryland, College Park faculty
Academic journal editors